Sam W. Heads (born 22 April 1983 in Northumberland, UK) is a British palaeontologist, a Fellow of the Linnean Society of London, a Fellow of the Royal Entomological Society, as well as a former Officer and Editor-in-Chief at the Orthopterists' Society.

He received his training at the University of Portsmouth where he was awarded a B.Sc. (Hons) in Palaeobiology and Evolution in 2004 and a Ph.D. in Entomology in 2009. Dr. Heads is an authority on the taxonomy, systematics and palaeontology of Orthoptera. He is based at the Illinois Natural History Survey, University of Illinois at Urbana-Champaign.

Select publications 

 Heads, S.W. & Wang, Y. 2013. First fossil record of Melanoplus differentialis (Orthoptera: Acrididae: Melanoplinae). Entomological News 123: 33–37.
 Heads, S.W., Taylor, S.J. & Krejca, J.K. 2013. First record of Scapteriscus abbreviatus from Belize (Orthoptera: Gryllotalpidae). Entomological News 123: 241–244.
 Hollier, J. & Heads, S.W. 2014. The type specimens of Orthoptera described by American entomologists in the Muséum d’histoire naturelle de Genève. Revue suisse de Zoology 121: 63–76.
 Barling, N., Heads, S.W. & Martill, D.M. 2013. A new parasitoid wasp (Hymenoptera: Chalcidoidea) from the Lower Cretaceous Crato Formation of Brazil: the first Mesozoic Pteromalidae. Cretaceous Research 45: 258–264,
 Hollier, J., Bruckner, H. & Heads, S.W. 2013. An annotated list of the Orthoptera (Insecta) species described by Henri de Saussure, with an account of the primary type material housed in the Muséum d’histoire naturelle de Genève, Part 5: Grylloidea. Revue suisse de Zoology 120: 445–535.
 Jepson, J.E., Heads, S.W., Makarkin, V.N. & Ren, D. 2013. New fossil mantidflies (Insecta, Neuroptera, Mantispidae) from the Mesozoic of northeastern China. Palaeontology 56: 603–613.
 Heads, S.W., Penney, D. & Green, D.I. 2012. A new species of the cricket genus Proanaxipha in Miocene amber from the Dominican Republic (Orthoptera, Gryllidae, Pentacentrinae). ZooKeys 229: 111–118.
 Pérez-de la Fuente, R., Heads, S.W., Hinojosa-Díaz, I.A. & Engel, M.S. 2012. The first record of Protogryllinae from the Jurassic of India (Orthoptera: Grylloidea). Journal of the Kansas Entomological Society 85: 53–58.
 Hollier, J. & Heads, S.W. 2012. An annotated list of the Orthoptera (Insecta) species described by Henri de Saussure, with an account of the primary type material housed in the Muséum d’histoire naturelle de Genève, Part 1: Tridactyloidea. Revue suisse de Zoology 119: 149–160.
 Rodríguez, F. & Heads, S.W. 2012. New mole crickets of the genus Scapteriscus Scudder (Orthoptera: Gryllotalpidae: Scapteriscinae) from Colombia. Zootaxa 3282: 61–68.
 Heads, S.W. & Taylor, S.J. 2012. A new species of Ripipteryx from Belize with a key to the species of the Scrofulosa Group (Orthoptera, Ripipterygidae). ZooKeys 169: 1–8.
 Heads, S.W. & Leuzinger, L. 2011. On the placement of the Cretaceous orthopteran Brauckmannia groeningae from Brazil, with notes on the relationships of Schizodactylidae (Orthoptera: Ensifera). ZooKeys 77: 17–30.
 Heads, S.W. 2010. New Tridactyloidea in Miocene amber from the Dominican Republic (Orthoptera: Caelifera). Annales de la Société Entomologique de France 46: 204–210.
 Heads, S.W. 2010. A new species of Ripipteryx from the Ecuadorian Andes (Orthoptera: Tridactyloidea: Ripipterygidae). Zootaxa 2476: 23–29.
 Heads, S.W. 2010. The first fossil spider cricket (Orthoptera: Gryllidae: Phalangopsinae): 20 million years of troglobiomorphosis or exaptation in the dark? Zoological Journal of the Linnean Society 158: 56–65.
 Heads, S.W. & Maehr, M.D. 2009. Proposed conservation of the name Gastrimargus Saussure, 1884 (Orthoptera: Acrididae: Oedipodinae) threatened by an unused senior homonym. Zootaxa 2268: 65–68.
 Heads, S.W. 2009. A new pygmy mole cricket in Cretaceous amber from Burma (Orthoptera: Tridactylidae). Denisia 26: 75–82.
 Heads, S.W. 2009. New pygmy grasshoppers in Miocene amber from the Dominican Republic (Orthoptera: Tetrigidae). Denisia 26: 69–74.
 Delclòs, X., Nel, A., Azar, D. Bechly, G., Dunlop, J.A., Engel, M.S. & Heads, S.W. 2008. The enigmatic Mesozoic insect taxon Chresmodidae (Polyneoptera): new palaeobiological and phylogenetic data, with the description of a new species from the Lower Cretaceous of Brazil. Neues Jahrbuch für Geologie und Paläontologie Abhandlungen 247: 353–381.
 Heads, S.W., Martill, D.M. & Loveridge, R.F. 2008. Palaeoentomological paradise: the Cretaceous Crato Formation of Brazil. Antenna 32: 91–98.
 Heads, S.W. & Chesmore, D. 2008. New records of the slender ground-hopper Tetrix subulata (Orthoptera: Tetrigidae) from Yorkshire. British Journal of Entomology & Natural History 21: 243–246.
 Heads, S.W. & Lakin, C. 2008. A new katydid of the genus Phoebolampta from St Maarten (Orthoptera: Tettigoniidae: Phaneropterinae). Polskie Pismo Entomologiczne 77: 256–266.
 Heads, S.W. 2008. A new species of Yuripopovia (Coleorrhyncha: Progonocimicidae) from the Early Cretaceous of the Isle of Wight. British Journal of Entomology & Natural History 21: 247–254 .
 Heads, S.W. 2008. The first fossil Proscopiidae (Insecta, Orthoptera, Eumastacoidea) with comments on the historical biogeography and evolution of the family. Palaeontology 51: 499–507.
 Heads, S.W. 2006 [for 2005]. A new caddisfly larval case (Insecta, Trichoptera) from the Lower Cretaceous Vectis Formation (Wealden Group) of the Isle of Wight, southern England. Proceedings of the Geologists’ Association 117: 307–310.
 Menon, F., Heads, S.W. & Martill, D.M. 2005. New Palaeontinidae (Insecta: Cicadomorpha) from the Lower Cretaceous Crato Formation of Brazil. Cretaceous Research 26: 837–844.
 Menon, F. & Heads, S.W. 2005. New species of Palaeontinidae (Insecta: Cicadomorpha) from the Lower Cretaceous Crato Formation of Brazil. Stuttgarter Beiträge zur Naturkunde, Serie B (Geologie und Paläontologie) 357: 1–11.
 Heads, S.W., Martill, D.M. & Loveridge, R.F. 2005. An exceptionally preserved antlion (Insecta, Neuroptera) with colour pattern preservation from the Cretaceous of Brazil. Palaeontology 48: 1409–1417.

References

External links
 Heads Lab website

1983 births
British entomologists
British palaeontologists
British evolutionary biologists
21st-century British zoologists
Alumni of the University of Portsmouth
Scientists from Northumberland
Fellows of the Linnean Society of London
Fellows of the Royal Entomological Society
Living people
University of Illinois Urbana-Champaign faculty